This is a list of aircraft produced by Ilyushin, a Russian aircraft manufacturer.

List of aircraft
Notable Ilyushin aircraft include:

Fighters

 I-21 (TsKB-32) fighter, 1936.
 Il-1 fighter prototype, 1944.

Ground-attack

 Il-2 Shturmovik ground-attack aircraft, NATO codename "Bark", 1939, most-produced military aircraft of all time.
 Il-6 (TsKB-60) ground attack aircraft project developed from the Il-2, 1941. Canceled due to the Il-8 and Il-10. 
 Il-8, ground-attack prototype developed from the Il-2 and intended as a Il-2 replacement, 1943.
 Il-10 "Beast", ground-attack aircraft developed from the Il-1, 1944.
 Il-16 ground-attack prototype developed from the Il-10, 1945.
 Il-20 ground-attack prototype; intended as a Il-10 replacement, 1948.
 Il-40 "Brawny" jet-powered ground-attack prototype, 1953.

Bombers

 DB-3 (TsKB-30) long-range bomber, 1935.
 Il-4 "Bob" bomber/torpedo bomber developed from the DB-3, 1939.
 DB-4 (TsKB-56) long-range bomber prototype, 1940.
 Il-22 jet-powered bomber prototype, world's first 4-engined straight-wing aircraft, 1947.
 Il-28 "Beagle" and "Mascot" medium bomber/trainer, world's first twinjet with an afterburner, 1948.
 Il-30 tactical swept wing bomber prototype developed from the Il-28, 1951.
 Il-46 jet-powered bomber prototype developed from the Il-30, 1952.
 Il-54 "Blowlamp" supersonic bomber prototype, 1955. Initially known as Il-149.

Transport

 Il-12 "Coach" twin-engine cargo/transport aircraft, 1945.
 Il-32 cargo glider prototype, 1948.
 Il-76 "Candid", strategic airlifter, world's most-produced aircraft of its class, 1971.
 Il-78 "Midas", an aerial refuelling variant of the Il-76, 1982.
 Il-82 airborne command post developed from the Il-76.
 Il-112 light military transport prototype, 2019.
 Il-276 medium-lift military transport aircraft, previously designated as Il-214.
 Il-476 internal designation for the Il-76MD-90A.

Passenger aircraft

 Il-14 "Crate" twin-engine transport aircraft developed from the Il-12, 1950.
 Il-18 "Clam" four-engine airliner prototype, 1946.
 Il-18 "Coot" turboprop airliner, one of world's principal transport for decades, 1957.
 Il-62 "Classic" long-range jet airliner, world's largest airliner when first flew, world's first mass-produced airliner of its category, 1963.
 Il-86 "Camber" medium-range wide-body jet airliner, first Soviet wide-body and the world's first quad-jet with 100% two floors, 1976.
 Il-80 "Maxdome" airborne command post developed from the Il-86, 1985.
 Il-87 "Aimak" airborne control variant of the Il-86.
 Il-96 long-haul widebody airliner developed from the Il-86, world's fastest wide-body aircraft, 1988.
 Il-98 aerial refueling variant of the Il-96.
 Il-114 regional aircraft, 1990.

Reconnaissance

 Il-20M "Coot-A" ELINT/radar reconnaissance version of the Il-18
 Il-22 "Coot-B" airborne command post version of the Il-18.
 Il-24 "Coot-C" ice reconnaissance version similar to Il-20M, 1948.
 Il-38 "May" maritime patrol/anti-submarine warfare aircraft developed from the Il-18, 1971.
 Il-140 AWACS version of Il-114.
 A-50 Shmel (from Beriev), an AWACS variant of the Il-76, NATO codename "Mainstay", 1978.
 A-100 Premier (from Beriev), an AWACS variant of the Il-76MD-90A.

Trainer

 Il-103 light trainer, 1994.

Experimental and projects

 TsKB-6 six-seat passenger/utility aircraft project.
 TsKB-26 proof of concept prototype for DB-3.
 M Sh attack aircraft project, 1942.
 Il-14 four-engine high-speed bomber project, 1944.
 Il-16 four-engine jet airliner project, 1954. Resembled the Tupolev Tu-110; cancelled due to the Tu-104.
 Il-24 twin-engine jet bomber project derived from the Il-22, 1947.
 Il-26 long-range bomber project, 1947.
 Il-34 projected motorized variant of Il-32, 1948.
 Il-36 long-range high-altitude reconnaissance aircraft project, 1949.
 Il-38 bomber project, 1948.
 Il-42 Sturmovik ground-attack project developed from the Il-40, late 1960s. Lost to the Sukhoi T-8.
 Il-48 medium front line bomber project, 1949.
 Il-52 flying wing bomber project.
 Il-56 front line bomber project, 1955.
 Il-58 carrier-based attack aircraft project, competitor to the Tupolev Tu-91, 1952.
 Il-60 four-engine military transport project, 1960. Lost to the Antonov An-22.
 Il-64 twin-engine airliner project, proposed Il-14 replacement, 1960.
 Il-66 supersonic transport (SST) project, 1959.
 Il-66 military transport project.
 Il-68 airliner project.
 Il-70 short-haul airliner project, 1961.
 Il-70 AEW aircraft project, 1969
 Il-72 supersonic airliner project developed from the Il-66, 1961.
 Il-72 trijet medium-haul airliner project, 1964.
 Il-74 trijet airliner project, enlarged Il-72 and competitor to the Tu-154, 1966.
 Il-84 search-and-rescue (SAR) variant of the Il-76, project cancelled, 1989.
 Il-88 transport aircraft project, 1972
 Il-90 proposed long-haul airliner, 1988.
 Il-100 light multi-purpose aircraft project, 2001.
 Il-102 experimental jet-powered ground-attack aircraft, project cancelled, 1982.
 Il-106 proposed heavy military transport, 1992.
 Il-108 business jet prototype, project abandoned, 1990.
 Il-116 regional propliner project.
 Il-118 proposed twin turboprop engine version of Il-18, 1984.
 Il-126 proposed business jet
 Il-196 long-range, high-capacity airliner project.
 A-60 experimental airborne laser laboratory developed from the Il-76MD, 1981.

Gallery 

Ilyushin
Ilyushin